He-Man: Defender of Grayskull is a 2005 multi-platform action-adventure game follow up to the 2003 Game Boy Advance game He-Man: Power of Grayskull. The game was designed by Savage Entertainment. Despite being completed and even featuring on the Xbox 360 Backwards Compatibility list, the game was never released on Xbox. An early prototype of the Xbox version, which predates the PlayStation 2 release by almost two years, was released online in September 2021.

Synopsis

Plot
The game's story opens with the kingdom of Eternia in turmoil. He-Man's nemesis Skeletor has surrounded Castle Grayskull with hostile forces yet again, but this time does it when Prince Adam happened to be away in Snake Mountain to run some errands. Without He-Man around to defend the castle, the Sorceress of Grayskull must pull back all of her power reserves to break off Skeletor's forces. Unfortunately, for He-Man that means he is going to have to set off as lowly Prince Adam and slowly restore his power as the game progresses.

He-Man gets wind of what is happening in with the Sorceress and must battle his way out of Snake Mountain, traverse Eternia whilst fighting off villains such as Shadow Beasts and Beast Men, and ultimately reaching Grayskull where a showdown with Skeletor awaits.

Gameplay
He-Man: Defender of Grayskull is an action adventure game view from a third person perspective. It starts the player off with limited powers and slowly allows He-Man to gain them as the levels progress. There is an emphasis on the various combat moves used by He-Man to defeat different enemies. As He-Man fights his way through the obstacles in each level, he adds new techniques and methods to his repertoire. At the start only the two handed sword is available, but later He-Man can swing his one handed sword with a shield combination or wield his magical axe. Each weapon has three basic moves and nine special moves, giving the players a versatile choice to choose from. Some combinations are more effective on certain enemies.

Although He-Man has several abilities, they have a limit. Players need to keep an eye out for two bars on the top screen; the health bar and the Grayskull bar. Just like any other game, once He-Man's health bar reaches zero, the game ends and Skeletor's army prevails. There are several game saving points within the levels. This allows the gamers to keep track of their progress and also at the same time, not lose much when He-Man loses health. The Grayskull bar monitors the special skill and combination attacks which can only performed when the bar is filled up to the limit or a certain level.

There are several supporting characters in the game. The Sorceress keeps on communicating with He-Man telepathically and also provides hints and tips to nudge He-Man in the right direction. Boss enemies are also present, some taken from the popular TV series itself such as Tri-Klops and some which are original, like the Sphinx. Some boss enemies help He-Man in the later levels when he defeats them. Apart from that, Battle Cat, Teela & Man-at-Arms make appearances as well, aiding He-Man in his journey. Battle Cat can be used to ride on to fight off enemies, or can be summoned to attack the enemies while you control He-Man to fire missiles from a distance, using the Tiger Armor.

Characters
 He-Man: Cam Clarke
 Skeletor: Brian Dobson
 The Sorceress: Nicole Oliver
 Tri- Klops: Paul Dobson
 Beast Man: Scott McNeil
 Sphinx: Cam Clarke

Reviews
He-Man: Defender of Grayskull received mixed reviews from users and critics. Nintendo Power gave the game 1.9 out of 5. It was heavily criticized by some due to a basic plot line.

References

External links
 
 

2005 video games
Action-adventure games
Beat 'em ups
Cancelled Xbox games
Europe-exclusive video games
Masters of the Universe video games
PlayStation 2 games
PlayStation 2-only games
Video games developed in the United States
Video games set on fictional planets
Savage Entertainment games
Single-player video games